Dyak may refer to one of the following.

 Dayak people, also called "Dyak", a native tribe of Borneo
 Dyak (clerk) a historical position of head of office in Russia